Enteromius raimbaulti is a species of ray-finned fish in the genus Enteromius which is endemic to Guinea. It is threatened by the decline in water quality due to agricultural pollution and damming of the rivers it occurs in.

Footnotes 

 

Enteromius
Fish described in 1962
Taxa named by Jacques Daget